Rodolphe Joseph Guilland (Lons-le-Saunier, 1888 – Saint-Marcellin, Isère, 5 October 1981) was a French Byzantinist.

Life
Born in 1888, he completed his thesis on Nikephoros Gregoras (a biography in 1926, and his edited correspondence in 1927), and succeeded his teacher Charles Diehl in the seat of Byzantine studies at the Sorbonne in 1934, which he held until his retirement in 1958. His chief interest was in the late Byzantine period (1204–1453), particularly the Palaiologan period, and his main areas of research were the history of the Great Palace of Constantinople, and of the offices, dignities, and administrative apparatus of the Byzantine state.

Works
He wrote 192 works on Byzantine subjects, spanning the years from 1921 to 1980. Many of his articles have been published in collected editions:
 Recherches sur les institutions byzantines, 2 vol. Berlin: Akademie-Verlag, 1967, xv+607 (I), 397 p. (II). Collecting 44 articles on Byzantine administrative history 
 Etudes de topographie de Constantinople byzantine, 2 vol. Berlin: Adolf Hakkert, 1969, xiv+395 p. (I), 184 p. (II). Collecting 42 articles on the Great Palace 
 Titres et fonctions de l'Empire byzantin, London : Variorum Reprints, 1976, 528 p. Collecting 26 articles on Byzantine administrative history

References

Sources
 
 

1888 births
1981 deaths
French Byzantinists
Academic staff of the University of Paris
People from Jura (department)